SCORE (Signal Communications by Orbiting Relay Equipment) was the world's first purpose-built communications satellite. Launched aboard an American Atlas rocket on December 18, 1958, SCORE provided the second test of a communications relay system in space (the first having been provided by the USAF/NASA's Pioneer 1), the first broadcast of a human voice from space, and the first successful use of the Atlas as a launch vehicle. It captured world attention by broadcasting a Christmas message via shortwave radio from U.S. President Dwight D. Eisenhower through an on-board tape recorder. The satellite was popularly dubbed "The Talking Atlas". SCORE, as a geopolitical strategy, placed the United States at an even technological par with the Soviet Union as a highly functional response to the Sputnik 1 and Sputnik 2 satellites.

Background
The six-month effort was the first endeavor of the then-new Advanced Research Projects Agency (ARPA) headed by Roy Johnson, and proved that a small, highly focused and versatile research group with appropriate resources was an ideal method to achieve the scientific and technological advances necessary to succeed in the emerging global space race.

SCORE's technical objectives were two-fold. In addition to showing that an Atlas missile was capable of satellite payload launch, the payload itself was a hundred times more massive than any previous US satellite. The program demonstrated the feasibility of transmitting messages through the upper atmosphere from one ground station to one or more ground stations. The result of the program, which used both real-time and store and forward techniques, was a major scientific breakthrough which proved that active communications satellites could provide a means of transmitting messages from one point to any other on  Earth.

Spacecraft
The spacecraft body served as antennae. This satellite was to demonstrate the feasibility and explore problems associated with, operation of a satellite communication system. It carried messages on a tape recorder which was used at one point to carry a Christmas greeting from President Eisenhower. The performance was nominal with experiment operation for 12 days, planned orbit lifetime 20 days, actual orbit lifetime 34 days. The tracking beacon operated at 108 MHz.

The SCORE communications package was designed and built by Kenneth Masterman-Smith, a military communication research engineer, along with other personnel with the U.S. Army Signal Research and Development Laboratory (SRDL) at Fort Monmouth, New Jersey. The overall program was conducted in such secrecy that only 88 people were aware of its existence. Before the date of the SCORE launch, 53 of the 88 people had been told the program had been canceled and they were not to mention to anyone that it had ever existed. That left only 35 people who knew of the mission of Atlas 10B with the rest of the engineering crew, including the launch crew, under the impression that they were working solely on a test launch of the rocket. The night before launch, however, Rear Adm. John E. Clark, deputy director of ARPA, was asked at a news conference whether he could deny that Eisenhower's voice was on the recorder. He replied, "No", and news reports that day suggested the voice might well be the president's.

Signal Communication by Orbiting Relay Equipment
This first communications satellite experiment consisted of 2 identical communications repeater terminals mounted in the guidance pods along the sides of the launch vehicle. The experiment was to test the feasibility and explore problems associated with, using satellites for communications purposes. No modulation was received on the carrier wave from experiment package no. 1. Voice and teletype messages were sent and returned in real-time, and also from experiment tape recorder no. 2. The tape recorder was loaded with new material 28 times and failure finally was due to battery depletion. The experiment receiver and transmitter operated on 150 and 132 MHz, respectively.

Mission
Its batteries lasted 12 days and it reentered the atmosphere on 21 January 1959.

The communications repeater installed on the missile would receive a signal, amplify it, and then retransmit it. Two redundant sets of equipment were mounted in the nose of the SCORE missile. Four antennas were mounted flush with the missile surface, two for transmission and two for reception. SCORE's other equipment included two tape recorders, each with a four-minute capacity. Any of four ground stations in the southern United States could command the satellite into playback mode to transmit the stored message or into record mode to receive and store a new message. These redundancies proved invaluable as one of the tape recorders malfunctioned and was rendered inoperable during the 12-day mission.

According to an official history of the Advanced Research Projects Agency (ARPA), SCORE was originally programmed to broadcast a voice message from Army Secretary Wilber M. Brucker. When the President learned this fact, hours before lift-off, he said he would like to provide the message. His tape-recording was hand-carried to Cape Canaveral, but by then the payload was locked and ready for launch. The ARPA program director decided to launch with the Army message, then erase it while in space, and upload the President's message to replace it. This effort was successful, and accordingly SCORE's transmitted message from space to Earth was as follows:

This is the President of the United States speaking. Through the marvels of scientific advance, my voice is coming to you from a satellite circling in outer space. My message is a simple one: Through this unique means I convey to you and to all mankind, America's wish for peace on Earth and goodwill toward men everywhere.

The broadcast signal for Eisenhower's greeting was fairly weak, and only very sensitive radio receivers were able to detect it. Most Americans heard the message as it was rebroadcast on commercial news programs.

See also

 List of communications satellite firsts
 Project Echo

References

Spacecraft launched in 1958
Communications satellites
Spacecraft which reentered in 1959
Advanced Research Projects Agency
Satellites of the United States